The Bristol Siddeley Nimbus, later known as the Rolls-Royce Nimbus, was a British turboshaft engine developed under license by Blackburn Aircraft Ltd. from the Turbomeca Turmo in the late 1950s. It was used on the Westland Scout and Westland Wasp helicopters.

Design and development
The Nimbus is a turboshaft engine comprising a gas generator section, which consists of a three-stage compressor, (two axial stages and one centrifugal stage), driven by a two-stage turbine in conjunction with an annular combustion chamber, and a power output section consisting of a single-stage free turbine driving an output shaft via a two-stage reduction gearbox.

In the Scout and Wasp the main rotor drive is taken from the front of the gearbox and is transmitted beneath the gas generator via a flexible coupling, while the drive for the tail rotor is taken from the rear of the gearbox.

The fuel system is designed to control and govern the engine under all operating conditions and to provide safeguards against malfunctions, the pilot selecting rotor speed and the governing element automatically maintaining the rotor speed within close limits under varying conditions of load.

The lubrication system is self-contained, the oil tank being integral with the air intake casing.

Engine and helicopter accessories are mounted on a gearbox located on the air intake casing.

Variants
The Nimbus engines were produced in two main variants, the Mark 103/503 and the Mark 105/502. The Mark 103/503 is generally similar to the Mark 105/502 except that the former has a double-caliper disc brake incorporated in the output drive shaft to provide adequate braking of the helicopter's rotor in the high winds encountered over the deck of a fast moving ship, whereas the 105/502 has a single caliper unit.
Blackburn-Turbomeca A.129
BnN.1 Nimbus
BnN.2 Nimbus
BnN.2/1 Nimbus
BnN.2/2 Nimbus
Nimbus 500
Nimbus 502 (Mk.105)
Nimbus 503: (Mk.103)
Nimbus Mk.103
Nimbus Mk.105

Applications

Westland Scout
Westland Wasp
Saunders-Roe SR.N2, Hovercraft

Specifications (Nimbus)

See also

References

Notes

Bibliography

 Gunston, Bill. World Encyclopedia of Aero Engines. Cambridge, England. Patrick Stephens Limited, 1989. 

1950s turboshaft engines
Nimbus